Ohel Chana is an Orthodox Jewish seminary for  women located in Melbourne, Australia. It is part of the Chabad Lubavitch hasidic movement. The center is managed by Rebbetzin Rivkah Groner. The seminary is named after Chana Schneerson, the mother of the last Rebbe of Chabad Lubavitch, Menachem Mendel Schneerson. The center was founded in 1971.

See also

Orthodox yeshivas in Australia
 Judaism in Australia

References 

1971 establishments in Australia
Chabad schools
Educational institutions established in 1971
Girls' schools in Victoria (Australia)
Hasidic Judaism in Australia
Orthodox yeshivas in Australia
Seminaries and theological colleges in Australia
St Kilda East, Victoria
Buildings and structures in the City of Port Phillip